Ahmed Rashed (Arabic:أحمد راشد علي) (born 10 July 1988) is an Emirati footballer. He currently plays for Dibba Al-Hisn as a midfielder .

References

External links
 

Emirati footballers
1988 births
Living people
Dibba FC players
Fujairah FC players
Dibba Al-Hisn Sports Club players
Place of birth missing (living people)
UAE First Division League players
UAE Pro League players
Association football midfielders